Noor Bank (formerly Noor Islamic Bank) was established in January 2008, in Dubai - United Arab Emirates.

In 2018, the bank was ranked the 11th largest bank in the UAE in terms of asset size.

Noor Bank is a full-service Shari’a-compliant bank, offering a range of products and services - in corporate and personal banking, wealth management, Takaful (Islamic insurance), treasury and trading. It has presence across the country, at multiple locations in Abu Dhabi, Dubai, Sharjah and Al Ain.

In addition to the Board of Directors, Noor Bank is also supervised by a Shari’a Supervisory Committee, and a team of scholars oversee and ensure Islamic compliance on all legal documentations, financial, products, services and banking matters.

History

Sheikh Mohammed bin Rashid Al Maktoum opened Noor Bank to the public on January 7, 2008. The bank's products and services are governed by a Shari’a Board, composed primarily of Islamic scholars from the fields of law and finance. Noor Bank is a subsidiary of Noor Investment Group LLC and a sister company of Noor Takaful.

In May 2008, the bank launched the first 24-hour, seven-days-a-week branch in the UAE. In November 2008, the bank opened a 24/7 branch at the Dubai Airport. In February 2009, the bank was ranked in the top ten mandated lead arrangers list by Bloomberg. That year, Noor Bank posted a net profit of US$139 million for the period ended December 31, 2008. After reporting an operating loss of US$2.5 million in the first half of 2010, the bank realized an operating profit of US$56.4 million by the second quarter of 2011. Noor Bank partnered with Emaar Properties in 2013 to provide mortgages to non-UAE residents.

In 2013, Noor Bank launched Noor Trade, a division of the bank directed at servicing small and medium enterprises (SMEs). Noor Trade is composed of two divisions, Business Banking and Emerging Corporates.

On 7 January 2014, the bank dropped 'Islamic' from its name, becoming 'Noor Bank' as part of a rebranding effort. That same year, the bank reported that its income had tripled.

As of 2016, Sheikh Ahmed Bin Mohammad Bin Rashid Al Maktoum is the bank's chairman, and the board of directors includes Sultan Ahmed bin Sulayem.

The Bank was established with an initial paid up capital of AED 3 billion. The Bank is one of only two banks in the UAE to be given special exemption by the UAE Federal Cabinet to continue to operate as a private entity, rather than listing its shares on a public stock exchange immediately upon incorporation as required under UAE Banking Law No. 10 of 1980.

The Government of Dubai, members of the Ruling Family of Dubai and a select group of Government of Dubai nominated UAE nationals own 88.3 per cent. of the Bank's shares in aggregate.

The remaining shares are owned by a member of Abu Dhabi Ruling Family, the Government of the United Arab Emirates, acting through Emirates Investment Authority (EIA), and an employee stock ownership trust.

The Crown Prince of Dubai Sheikh Hamdan Bin Mohammed Bin Rashid Al Maktoum, owns 25.89 per cent. of the Bank. Sheikh Hamdan Bin Mohammed Bin Rashid Al Maktoum is also the Chairman of the Dubai Executive Council.

The Government of Dubai, acting through Investment Corporation of Dubai (ICD), owns 22.85 per cent. of the Bank. ICD, chaired by the Ruler of Dubai, is the principal investment arm of the Government of Dubai and was established in May 2006 by decree (11) of 2006 under a mandate to consolidate and manage the Government of Dubai's portfolio of commercial companies and investments. It also provides strategic oversight by developing and implementing investment strategy and corporate governance policies with an objective to maximise stakeholder value, for the long-term benefit of the Emirate.

The Government of the United Arab Emirates acting through EIA, owns 4.42 per cent. of the Bank. EIA was established by Emiri decree in November 2007 and is the only Sovereign Wealth Fund of the Federal Government of the United Arab Emirates. Chaired by Sheikh Mansour Bin Zayed Al Nahyan, EIA is dedicated to delivering sustained financial gains for the UAE.

No shareholder, other than the ones listed above, owns more than 5 per cent of the Bank's shares.

In order to recognise and retain key employees, an employee stock ownership trust was introduced in 2013. The employee stock ownership trust constitutes less than 5 per cent. of the Bank's share capital.

Noor Bank was acquired by Dubai Islamic Bank on 22 Jan 2020 to integrate Shari’a banking in the emirate of Dubai.

References

Banks established in 2008
Islamic banks of the United Arab Emirates